Stanley Rose (1924 – October 18, 2000) was a Canadian football player who played for the Montreal Hornets and Saskatchewan Roughriders. He played junior football in Montreal.

Rose was a longtime employee of Canadair. He died in 2000, aged 76.

References

1924 births
2000 deaths
Saskatchewan Roughriders players
Canadian football quarterbacks